JKC may refer to:

 Japan Kennel Club, the primary registry body for purebred dog pedigrees in Japan
 Jagarlamudi Kuppuswamy Chowdary College (abbreviated to JKC College), an educational institution in Andhra Pradesh, India
 Jagadguru Kripalu Chikitsalaya, a hospital group in India, part of Jagadguru Kripalu Parishat
 Jack Kent Cooke (1912–1997), Canadian entrepreneur and sports team owner
 Jack Kent Cooke Stadium, later renamed FedExField, a sports stadium in Maryland